CDPS may refer to:

Cirencester Deer Park School
Cooperative distributed problem solving